Formed in 1992, the State and Territorial Injury Prevention Directors Association (STIPDA) is a nonprofit organization of public health injury professionals representing all states and territories of the United States. STIPDA's aim is to strengthen the ability of state, territorial and local health departments to reduce death and disability associated with injury and violence.

Support for STIPDA comes from long-term federal grants and contracts from the US Centers for Disease Control and Prevention - National Center for Injury Prevention and Control, the National Highway Traffic Safety Administration (NHTSA), the Health Resources and Services Administration (HRSA), the Association of State and Territorial Health Officials (ASTHO), U.S. State Health Departments and the members of STIPDA.

The State and Territorial Injury Prevention Directors Association (STIPDA) officially changed its name to the Safe States Alliance in April 2010.

External links 
 

Medical and health organizations based in Georgia (U.S. state)
Safety organizations